Anzyak (Änyäk) is a rural locality (a selo) in Rukhtinsky Selsoviet, Duvansky District, Bashkortostan, Russia. The population was 382 as of 2010. There are 2 streets.

Geography 
Anzyak is located 18 km southeast of Mesyagutovo (the district's administrative centre) by road. Rukhtino is the nearest rural locality.

References 

Rural localities in Duvansky District